Todd Woodbridge and Mark Woodforde were the defending champion, but lost in the quarterfinals to Saša Hiršzon and Goran Ivanišević.

Sébastien Lareau and Alex O'Brien won the title, by defeating Mahesh Bhupathi and Leander Paes 4–6, 6–3, 7–5 in the final.

Seeds
Champion seeds are indicated in bold text while text in italics indicates the round in which those seeds were eliminated.

Draw

Finals

Top half

Bottom half

References

Doubles
1998 Eurocard Open